Patricio Calero (born July 20, 1977 in El Empalme, Guayas) is a boxer from Ecuador, who represented his native country in the Men's Light Flyweight (– 48 kg) category at the 2004 Summer Olympics in Athens, Greece.

There he was stopped in the first round by Russia's eventual bronze medalist Sergey Kazakov. Calero won the bronze medal in the same weight division at the 1999 Pan American Games. He qualified for the Olympic Games by ending up in second place at the 2nd AIBA American 2004 Olympic Qualifying Tournament in Rio de Janeiro, Brazil.

Results

1999 Pan American Games
Defeated , 14:1

2003 Pan American Games

References
  sports-reference

1977 births
Living people
People from Velasco Ibarra
Flyweight boxers
Boxers at the 1999 Pan American Games
Boxers at the 2003 Pan American Games
Boxers at the 2004 Summer Olympics
Olympic boxers of Ecuador
Ecuadorian male boxers
Pan American Games bronze medalists for Ecuador
Pan American Games medalists in boxing
South American Games gold medalists for Ecuador
South American Games medalists in boxing
Competitors at the 2002 South American Games
Competitors at the 2006 South American Games
Medalists at the 1999 Pan American Games
21st-century Ecuadorian people